JS Kaga (DDH-184) is a helicopter carrier being converted into an aircraft carrier beginning in March, 2022.

The ship bears the same name, and is slightly longer in length than, the World War II-era , an aircraft carrier produced in 1928, which participated in the attack on Pearl Harbor. Kaga and Izumo are the first aircraft carriers built by Japan since the end of World War II. Kaga was built as part of a wider Japanese military buildup, triggered from heightened Sino-Japanese tensions regarding the contested ownership of the Senkaku Islands.

Construction

Kaga was intended to replace the aging  , based on the schedule outlined within the 23 Mid-term Defence Capability Maintenance Plan to construct a 19,500-ton helicopter destroyer. Construction began at the Yokohama plant of Japan Marine United on 7 October 2013, and the ship was launched on 27 August 2015, with the commissioning on 22 March 2017. Construction of the ship cost .

Characteristics

Aircraft carried
The ship can host up to 28 aircraft, or 14 larger aircraft. While Japanese nomenclature calls Kaga a "multi-purpose operation destroyer", its main purpose is destroying enemy submarines. Despite this, only 7 anti-submarine warfare helicopters and 2 search and rescue helicopters are planned for the initial aircraft complement. 400 troops and 50 3.5-ton trucks (or equivalent equipment) can also be carried.

Kagas flight deck has five helicopter landing spots that allow for simultaneous landings or take-offs. Like the Izumo, Kaga features no 'ski-jump' ramp for aircraft takeoff, instead using a square flight deck, in a similar manner to the American  and  amphibious assault ships.

In 2010, Forecast International reported that some design features were intended to support fixed-wing aircraft such as the Bell-Boeing V-22 Osprey and Lockheed Martin F-35 Lightning II; as of 2019 both Kaga and Izumo are scheduled to be refit to accommodate the F-35B STOVL variant during its five-year overhaul in 2022. Kagas reconstruction is estimated to be completed as early as 2021.

In 2019, it was reported that Prime Minister Shinzo Abe approved a  five-year defence budget, which included the upgrade of Izumo and Kaga and the purchase of a combined 147 F-35A and F-35B stealth fighters. According to the newspaper Mainichi Shimbun, the Japan Air Self-Defense Force (JASDF) is planning to acquire a total of 42 F-35B variants, introducing 18 by FY2023, six in FY2024 and two in FY2025. These are to form a single squadron consisting of about 20 aircraft. Japan’s Defense Minister, Nobuo Kishi, announced that Nyutabaru Air Base in Miyazaki Prefecture, Kyushu will host the F-35Bs.The base is located in close proximity to the Southwest Islands, including Okinawa, and JMSDF’s Kure Base in Hiroshima Prefecture, which is Kaga‘s home port. Kaga began her initial modifications in March 2022 at the Japan Marine United (JMU) shipyard in Kure, Hiroshima Prefecture. The proposed modification of Kaga will be more extensive than for her sister ship (and significantly more expensive) and includes changes to the shape of the bow. The initial modification of Kaga is expected to take 14 months, followed by a second modification of the ship’s interior, which is expected to begin in March 2027.

Size 

Air-defense
The ship is equipped with two Phalanx CiWS (close-in weapon systems) and two SeaRAM CiWS for her defense.

History
Kaga toured the South China Sea and the Indian Ocean in 2018 in order to bolster Japan's presence in geostrategic waters.

During a state visit to Japan in May 2019, Donald Trump visited Kaga in Yokosuka. During his visit, Trump made a speech in which he claimed that many of the United States's allies were taking advantage of its high defense budget by not spending enough on their own militaries. Trump congratulated Japan for "being a good ally and buying American", and wished them success in the coming Reiwa Era.

Gallery

References

External links 
 

Izumo-class helicopter destroyers
Helicopter carriers
2015 ships
Ships built by Japan Marine United